The  was a six-car Japanese Shinkansen train built in 1979 as the prototype for the new (200 series) trains to be operated on the Tōhoku Shinkansen and Jōetsu Shinkansen routes.

Design
The Class 962 trainset incorporated technology developed in the earlier Class 951 and Class 961 set, with extensive snow-proofing features to cope with revenue service in the wintry areas served by the Tōhoku and Jōetsu Shinkansen routes. The design limited the maximum axle load to 16.3 tonnes.

Bogie shrouds and diaphragms between cars were fitted to this set as a noise reduction measure, but these features were not used on the 200 series design due to the complications this added to maintenance. The DT9019 and DT9020 bogies were derived from the DT200A design used on the earlier 0 series trains.

Internally, only cars 1 and 4 were fitted out with passenger seating. The latter were used on production 200 series trains with increased seat pitch.

Formation
The 6-car set was formed as follows.

Cars 2, 4, and 6 were equipped with scissors type pantographs.

History
The train was unveiled on 22 February 1979. Test running on the Tōhoku Shinkansen test track at Oyama continued until June 1980. After this, the train was used for test running on the Jōetsu Shinkansen prior to the opening of the line.

From January 1983, the train was converted to become the 7-car Class 925-10 "Doctor Yellow" track and overhead line inspection train S2 with the insertion of track condition recording car 921-41 built by Tokyu Car Corporation in November 1980. This train was withdrawn on 25 January 2003.

References

Experimental and prototype high-speed trains
962
Tōhoku Shinkansen
Train-related introductions in 1979
Hitachi multiple units
25 kV AC multiple units
Kawasaki multiple units
Kinki Sharyo multiple units
Tokyu Car multiple units
Nippon Sharyo multiple units